is a fighting game released for the Game Boy Advance. It is non-canonical to the Tekken storyline, but follows the events of Tekken 3. It uses sprites based on Tekken 3 3D models for its characters. It was the first Tekken game to be released on a Nintendo platform.

Gameplay
The gameplay in Tekken Advance is similar to other games in the series, but because it is on a portable system, the inputs were simplified or removed altogether. It utilizes a single-input system, with kick mapped to the A button, punch to the B button, and the left and right triggers used for tagging and throws, respectively. The game also included a side-step feature.

Despite the simplification, Tekken Advance introduces new mechanics by implementing a wide range of "stun" variations such as "pop stuns", "crumple stuns" and right/left stuns.

Characters
The game features most of the starter characters from Tekken 3, with the exceptions of Eddy Gordo and Lei Wulong. Gun Jack, who was unlockable in Tekken 3, is playable from the start, with Heihachi Mishima being the sole unlockable character and final boss in lieu of Ogre.

Ling Xiaoyu
Yoshimitsu
Nina Williams
Forest Law
Gun Jack
Hwoarang
Heihachi Mishima (unlockable)
Paul Phoenix
King
Jin Kazama

Reception

Tekken Advance has generally received positive reviews. It received an 8.5 out of 10 from IGN, and an 8 out of 10 from GameSpot saying "It looks and feels close enough to its counterpart to succeed." GameSpy gave it a much more favourable score with 88 out of 100, calling it an impressive game for the Game Boy Advance. Electronic Gaming Monthly gave it a mediocre score with 5.83 out of 10. Nintendo Power gave the game a 3.5 out of 5.

Tekken Advance was a runner-up for GameSpots annual "Best Graphics on Game Boy Advance" award, which went to Yoshi's Island: Super Mario Advance 3.

Notes

References

External links
Official website 

2001 video games
Game Boy Advance games
Game Boy Advance-only games
Namco games
Video games developed in Japan
Video games scored by Atsuhiro Motoyama
Video games scored by Hitoshi Sakimoto
Advance